Stig Andersson (7 August 1927 – 30 April 2016) was a Swedish sprint canoeist who competed in the early to mid-1950s. He won three medals at the ICF Canoe Sprint World Championships with two golds (K-4 10000 m: 1950, 1954) and a silver (K-4 1000 m: 1954). Andersson also won six Swedish championships, four Nordic championships and one European championships. As of 2010, he resided in Västervik.

References

External links

1927 births
2016 deaths
Swedish male canoeists
ICF Canoe Sprint World Championships medalists in kayak